Al Leonzi (died February 14, 2014) was an American football coach.

He served as the head football coach at the Kutztown University of Pennsylvania.

References

Year of birth missing
2014 deaths
Kutztown Golden Bears football coaches